L'enfant, better known as Man and Baby is a 1987 photographic poster depicting a shirtless male model (Adam Perry) holding a young baby. The image, conceived by Paul Rodriguez was photographed by Spencer Rowell and published in the 1980s by British company Athena Posters. The photograph was said to herald the "sensitive but sexy New Man" aesthetic.

In 2011 the poster became part of the V&A Print collection and can be viewed in the Prints and Drawings Study Room level C. V&A, London and is published on p. 58 British Posters. Advertising, Art and Activism (Flood., C. V&A: 2012)

In a 2004 British television documentary about L'Enfant, The Model, the Poster and 3,000 Women, Perry claimed that as a result of his poster fame he had slept with 3,000 women. The programme also identified the baby as Greek-Cypriot Stelios Havatzios. Stelios currently lives in Limassol, Cyprus with his family and works as a lawyer. In 2013, Havatzios appeared as the Mystery Guest on The Big Fat Quiz of the '80s. Perry, who was paid £100 for the photo shoot, worked as a London-based carpenter in 2007.

Senator Josh Hawley  once hung the photo over his dorm room bed at Stanford.

Further reading

See also
Tennis Girl

References

External links

Spencer Rowell official site.
 Newborn Photography Ideas at Home

Posters
1980s photographs